Ford's Mills is a settlement in Weldford Parish, New Brunswick at the intersection of Route 470 and Route 510 on the Richibucto River.

Ford's Mills in 2010 is home of The Greenwood Lodge which hosts, community suppers and excellent musical entertainment including some well known Maritime musicians such as Matt Minglewood. The local ambulance and fire protection services are located in this community. Fords Mill is located 3.83 km E of Cails Mills and was first called Coal Branch.

History

Fords Mills is named for John Prall Ford, born August 1, 1789 at Hammond River, who died suddenly on August 2, 1869 at Hammond River, New Brunswick at age 80 years, burial at St. Paul's Church of England, Hampton, New Brunswick. He married Phoebe Townsend, she died March 24, 1887, age 95, at Coal Branch, New Brunswick. He was son of Captain John Ford, born 1746 who died in 1823 and was an Officer with the New Jersey Volunteers and married to Alcha Prall of Dutch ancestry. Mr. J. P. Ford, formerly of Halifax, built The Fords Mill on the Richibucto River about the year 1825.

Daniel F. Johnson's New Brunswick Newspaper Transcripts at Provincial Archives New Brunswick - "August 4, 1869 County : Saint John Place : Saint John Newspaper : Morning News John P. FORD, Esq., nearly 80 years old, resident of Kings Co. suddenly dropped dead just outside his house at Hammond River, Monday morn., directly after taking his breakfast."

There was a Post Office in Coal Branch from 1868–1883 and in 1871 Coal Branch had a population of 200. The community was renamed Fords Mills in 1883 and had a Post Office from 1883-1966. In 1904 Ford's Mills was a lumbering settlement with 2 stores, 1 sawmill, 1 grist mill and a population of 150.

Notable people

See also
List of communities in New Brunswick

Settlements in New Brunswick
Communities in Kent County, New Brunswick